Lafayette School is a fieldstone schoolhouse built in 1921 and located at 79 Mill Road in the Lower Berkshire Valley section of Roxbury Township in Morris County, New Jersey. It was added to the National Register of Historic Places on September 1, 2022, for its significance in architecture. Designed by the architectural firm of Rasmussen & Wayland (William Whitney Rasmussen and Harry C. Wayland) from New York City, the school features American Craftsman style.

History and description

The first known schoolhouse in the valley was built . It burned down and was replaced with another . It was replaced by the Lafayette School, which was built as a two-room schoolhouse in 1921. The architect was the firm of Rasmussen & Wayland, who also designed several other New Jersey schools. American Craftsman and Carpenter Gothic architectural styles were featured, which emphasized the simple use of materials and craftsmanship. The general contractor was the Gallo Brothers of Netcong. The schoolhouse remained in use until 1964, when the Jefferson Elementary School was built in Succasunna. The building is currently used to store athletic equipment for Berkshire Valley Park.

See also
 National Register of Historic Places listings in Morris County, New Jersey

References

External links
 

Roxbury Township, New Jersey
Stone buildings in the United States
American Craftsman architecture in New Jersey
National Register of Historic Places in Morris County, New Jersey
School buildings on the National Register of Historic Places in New Jersey
School buildings completed in 1921
Schools in Morris County, New Jersey
1921 establishments in New Jersey
Defunct schools in New Jersey
New Jersey Register of Historic Places